The 2008–09 season saw Atlético Madrid return to the UEFA Champions League after an eleven-year absence. The team marked the return with an impressive group stage performance, only denied winning the group by a late penalty for Liverpool at Anfield. In the round of 16, Atlético went out on away goals to Porto, being denied entry to the last eight.

In the league, Atlético repeated the 4th place of 2007–08, improving on the previous season by three points. Uruguayan striker Diego Forlán had a tremendous season, scoring 32 league goals, the highest amount of La Liga goals for a single player in a decade.

Squad

Goalkeepers
  Grégory Coupet (1)
  Leo Franco (25)
  Ángel Bernabé (27)

Defenders

Midfielders

Attackers
  Diego Forlán (7)
  Luis García (9)
  Sergio Agüero (10)
  Florent Sinama Pongolle (14)

Competitions

La Liga

League table

Matches
Atlético Madrid–Málaga 4-0
 1-0 John Heitinga 
 2-0 Diego Forlán 
 3-0 Diego Forlán 
 4-0 Florent Sinama Pongolle 
Valladolid–Atlético Madrid 2-1
 1-0 Ángel Vivar Dorado 
 2-0 Javier Baraja 
 2-1 Sergio Agüero 
Atlético Madrid–Recreativo Huelva 4-0
 1-0 Sergio Agüero 
 2-0 Maniche 
 3-0 Florent Sinama Pongolle 
 4-0 Florent Sinama Pongolle 
Getafe–Atlético Madrid 1-2
 0-1 Florent Sinama Pongolle 
 1-1 Juan Ángel Albín 
 1-2 David Cortés 
Atlético Madrid–Sevilla 0-1
 0-1 Luís Fabiano 
Barcelona–Atlético Madrid 6-1
 1-0 Rafael Márquez 
 2-0 Samuel Eto'o 
 3-0 Lionel Messi 
 3-1 Maxi Rodríguez 
 4-1 Samuel Eto'o 
 5-1 Eiður Guðjohnsen 
 6-1 Thierry Henry 
Atlético Madrid–Real Madrid 1-2
 0-1 Ruud van Nistelrooy 
 0-2 Gonzalo Higuaín 
 1-2 Simão 
Villarreal–Atlético Madrid 4-4
 0-1 Simão 
 0-2 Diego Forlán 
 1-2 Marcos Senna 
 2-2 Joseba Llorente 
 3-2 Gonzalo Rodríguez 
 4-2 Giuseppe Rossi 
 4-3 Simão 
 4-4 Raúl García 
Atlético Madrid–Mallorca 2-0
 1-0 Sergio Agüero 
 2-0 Sergio Agüero 
Osasuna–Atlético Madrid 0-0
Atlético Madrid–Deportivo 4-1
 1-0 John Heitinga 
 2-0 Diego Forlán 
 3-0 Maxi Rodríguez 
 4-0 Diego Forlán 
 4-1 Filipe Luís 
Numancia–Atlético Madrid 1-1
 0-1 Diego Forlán 
 1-1 José Barkero 
Atlético Madrid–Racing Santander 4-1
 0-1 Mohammed Tchité 
 1-1 Simão 
 2-1 Sergio Agüero 
 3-1 Diego Forlán 
 4-1 Diego Forlán 
Sporting Gijón–Atlético Madrid 2-5
 1-0 Mate Bilić 
 1-1 Sergio Agüero 
 1-2 Sergio Agüero 
 1-3 Diego Forlán 
 2-3 David Barral 
 2-4 Maxi Rodríguez 
 2-5 Diego Forlán 
Atlético Madrid–Betis 2-0
 1-0 Maxi Rodríguez 
 2-0 Sergio Agüero 
Espanyol–Atlético Madrid 2-3
 0-1 Maxi Rodríguez 
 1-1 Sergio Sánchez 
 1-2 Sergio Agüero 
 1-3 Maxi Rodríguez 
 2-3 Valdo 
Valencia–Atlético Madrid 3-1
 1-0 David Villa 
 2-0 David Silva 
 2-1 Diego Forlán 
 3-1 David Silva 
Atlético Madrid–Athletic Bilbao 2-3
 1-0 Antonio López 
 1-1 Koikili 
 1-2 Fernando Llorente 
 1-3 Fernando Llorente 
 2-3 Diego Forlán 
Almería–Atlético Madrid 1-1
 1-0 Kalu Uche 
 1-1 Florent Sinama Pongolle 
Málaga–Atlético Madrid 1-1
 1-0 Apoño 
 1-1 John Heitinga 
Atlético Madrid–Valladolid 1-2
 0-1 Luis Prieto 
 1-1 José García Calvo 
 1-2 Víctor 
Recreativo Huelva–Atlético Madrid 0-3
 0-1 Sergio Agüero 
 0-2 Diego Forlán 
 0-3 Diego Forlán 
Atlético Madrid–Getafe 1-1
 1-0 Diego Forlán 
 1-1 Juan Ángel Albín 
Sevilla–Atlético Madrid 1-0
 1-0 Jesús Navas 
Atlético Madrid–Barcelona 4-3
 0-1 Thierry Henry 
 0-2 Lionel Messi 
 1-2 Diego Forlán 
 2-2 Sergio Agüero 
 2-3 Thierry Henry 
 3-3 Diego Forlán 
 4-3 Sergio Agüero 
Real Madrid–Atlético Madrid 1-1
 0-1 Diego Forlán 
 1-1 Klaas-Jan Huntelaar 
Atlético Madrid–Villarreal 3-2
 0-1 Matías Fernández 
 0-2 Cani 
 1-2 Sergio Agüero 
 2-2 Diego Forlán 
 3-2 Antonio López 
Mallorca–Atlético Madrid 2-0
 1-0 Aritz Aduriz 
 2-0 Chory Castro 
Atlético Madrid–Osasuna 2-4
 0-1 Walter Pandiani 
 1-1 Diego Forlán 
 1-2 Krisztián Vadócz 
 1-3 Walter Pandiani 
 1-4 Masoud Shojaei 
 2-4 Pablo Ibáñez 
Deportivo–Atlético Madrid 1-2
 0-1 Sergio Agüero 
 0-2 Simão 
 1-2 Rodolfo Bodipo 
Atlético Madrid–Numancia 3-0
 1-0 Éver Banega 
 2-0 Diego Forlán 
 3-0 Simão 
Racing Santander–Atlético Madrid 5-1
 1-0 Christian 
 2-0 Ezequiel Garay 
 3-0 Mohammed Tchité 
 3-1 Diego Forlán 
 4-1 Pedro Munitis 
 5-1 Nikola Žigić 
Atlético Madrid–Sporting Gijón 3-1
 1-0 Diego Forlán 
 2-0 Simão 
 3-0 Sergio Agüero 
 3-1 Mate Bilić 
Betis–Atlético Madrid 0-2
 0-1 Diego Forlán 
 0-2 Diego Forlán 
Atlético Madrid–Espanyol 3-2
 0-1 Nenê 
 0-2 Dani Jarque 
 1-2 Diego Forlán 
 2-2 Sergio Agüero 
 3-2 Diego Forlán 
Atlético Madrid–Valencia 1-0
 1-0 Diego Forlán 
Athletic Bilbao–Atlético Madrid 1-4
 0-1 Raúl García 
 1-1 Xabier Etxeita 
 1-2 Diego Forlán 
 1-3 Diego Forlán 
 1-4 Diego Forlán 
Atlético Madrid–Almería 3-0
 1-0 Sergio Agüero 
 2-0 Raúl García 
 3-0 Diego Forlán

Top scorers

La Liga
  Diego Forlán 32
  Sergio Agüero 17
  Simão 7
  Maxi Rodríguez 5
  Florent Sinama Pongolle 5

Atlético Madrid seasons
Atletico Madrid